DeAnne DeFuccio  (born March 26, 1973) is an American Republican Party politician who has served in the New Jersey General Assembly from the 39th district since 2021.

Early life and education
Born in Oakland, DeFuccio grew up in nearby Franklin Lakes. She earned her undergraduate degree from Union College and was awarded a JD from Suffolk University Law School.

Political office
She had served as a member of the Borough Council in Upper Saddle River, New Jersey until she was chosen to fill the Assembly seat vacated by Holly Schepisi, who had moved up to the New Jersey Senate. She has been the Assistant Minority Conference Leader in the Assembly since 2022.

On February 2, 2023, DeFuccio announced that she would not seek re-election to the Assembly, despite previously announcing her candidacy.

Committees 
Committee assignments for the current session are:
Health
Science, Innovation and Technology
Women and Children

District 39
Each of the 40 districts in the New Jersey Legislature has one representative in the New Jersey Senate and two members in the New Jersey General Assembly. The representatives from the 39th District for the 2022—23 Legislative Session are:
Senator Holly Schepisi (R)
Assemblyman Robert Auth (R)
Assemblywoman DeAnne DeFuccio (R)

References

1973 births
Living people
New Jersey city council members
Republican Party members of the New Jersey General Assembly
People from Franklin Lakes, New Jersey
People from Oakland, New Jersey
People from Upper Saddle River, New Jersey
Politicians from Bergen County, New Jersey
Women state legislators in New Jersey
21st-century American politicians
21st-century American women politicians
Union College (New York) alumni
Suffolk University Law School alumni